General elections are scheduled to be held in Panama on 5 May 2024. Due to constitutional term limits, incumbent president Laurentino Cortizo is ineligible for a second consecutive term.

Electoral system 
Of the 71 members of the National Assembly, 26 will be elected in single-member constituencies and 45 by proportional representation in multi-member constituencies. Each district with more than 40,000 inhabitants forms a constituency. Constituencies elect one MP for every 30,000 residents and an additional representative for every fraction over 10,000.

In single-member constituencies MPs are elected using the first-past-the-post system. In multi-member constituencies MPs are elected using party list proportional representation according to a double quotient; the first allocation of seats uses a simple quotient, further seats are allotted using the quotient divided by two, with any remaining seats are awarded to the parties with the greatest remainder.

The President is elected through plurality vote in one round.

Presidential candidates

Publicly expressed interest
Ricardo Martinelli, former president of Panama and leader of Realizing Goals.
Ricardo Lombana, former presidential candidate and leader of Movimiento Otro Camino.
José Gabriel Carrizo, current vice-president of Panama and member of Democratic Revolutionary Party.

Opinion polls

References 

2024
Panama
Elections in Panama